Seobinggo Station is a station on the Gyeongui-Jungang Line. It is located near the northern end of Banpo Bridge. The southeastern part of the Yongsan Garrison, a military base in Seoul, is served by this station. The Embassy of Turkey is close from Exit 1.

Vicinity
Exit 1: Seobinggo Elementary School, Turkish Embassy of Korea, Hangang Middle School
Exit 2: Sindonga APT, Banpo Bridge, Jamsu Bridge

External links
 Station information from Korail

Seoul Metropolitan Subway stations
Railway stations opened in 1917
Metro stations in Yongsan District